Abū l-Khaṭṭāb Muḥammad ibn Abī Zaynab Miqlāṣ al-Asadī (Arabic: اَبُوالخَطّاب مُحَمَّد بن أبی زَینَب المِقلاص الأَسَدی) nicknamed al-Barrād al-Ajda (Arabic: البَرّاد الأَجدَع) was the founder of the Ghuli sect Khattabiyya, and was cursed by Ja'far al-Sadiq for his extreme beliefs. He is also considered among the revolutionaries of the beginning of the Abbasid era (c. 138/755).

Beliefs 
According to Saad Ash'ari, which is confirmed by other sources, including various narrations of Kashi, Abul Khattab initially claimed that al-Sadiq made him his guardian and taught him the esm aazam (great divine name). Some time later, he claimed to be a "prophet" and after that he claimed to be a "messenger". Then he said that he is one of the angels and the messenger of God to the people of the earth. The report of Saad Ash'ari tells that the earlier khatabiyya considered al-Sadiq as a God and Abul Khattab as a messenger sent by Sadiq who ordered to obey him.

In Imamiyya belief
Shia sources mention him well after the disagreement between him and Ja'far al-Sadiq due to the distortion of Imami teachings. 
It has been stated in various narrations that Abu l-Khattab called his followers to worship Ja'far al-Sadiq and considered himself one of his prophets. In other narrations attributed to imams, it is stated that Abu l-Khattab attributed false words to Sadiq and distorted his statements. According to these narrations, al-Sadiq made his companions aware of Abu l-Khattab misguidance by cursing him. Also, in various narrations, Abu l-Khattab has been interpreted as a transgressor, an infidel, a polytheist and an enemy of God, and in a narration given by Ibn Babuyeh in Al-Khasal, citing Sadiq, in the interpretation of verses 221-222 of Surah Al-Shaara, Abul Khattab is considered one of those Satan descends upon them.
There are reports about Abu al-Khattab's relationship with al-Sadiq, before he became a Ghali: in a narration quoted by Kulayni from Ali ibn Uqbah, Abu al-Khattab used to present the questions of the Companions of al-Sadiq to him and send the answers to the Companions. Ghazi Noman has also stated that he was close to al-Sadiq before his defection. In Imamiyyah hadith books, there are hadiths narrated by Abu l-Khattab from al-Sadiq, and in some of them it is stated that these hadiths are related to the time when Abu l-Khattab had not deviated. The time of Abul Khattab's deviation is estimated around 135 AD.

Relation with Shia sects
It seems that Abu’l-Ḵaṭṭāb  formed the Ismaili teaching about transference of spiritual authority  and the Noṣayrī s' belief in the manifestation of divinity in man (ḥolūl). he stated that Imam Ja’far has delegated his authority by appointing him as his waṣī (deputy or executor of his will) and entrusting him with the name esm al-aʿẓam (the “Greatest Name”), which was supposed “to empower its possessor with extraordinary strength in conceiving hidden matters”. In the Fatimid Ismaili works, he is condemned as a heretic who taught radical ideas unacceptable to the Fatimids. The latter, like the Twelvers, rejected his teachings as his personal interpretations attributed to al-Sadiq.
Nasiriyyah highly respected Abul Khattab and always compared his character to Salman Farsi. They consider Sadiq's curse to be an act of Taqia and have narrated many hadiths by quoting al-Sadiq and other imams in Abu'l-Khattab's virtues. Also, in some ancient sources, it has been mentioned that Abu al-Khattab and Khattabiya were connected with the Ismailis, although there is no mention of such connections in the official Ismaili sources.

Death
Abul Khattab along with his followers in Kufa - during the governorship of Isa bin Musa (132-147 AH) on behalf of Caliph Mansour - rebelled against the caliphate system, while calling al-Sadiq a divin. And this caused their killing to be legalized by the government.

References

 
 

Ghulat
Ghulat leaders
People from Kufa
8th-century Muslim theologians
Islamic scholars
Muslim writers

fa:ابوالخطاب
ar:محمد بن أبي زينب
tr:Ebû'l-Hattâb el-Esedî
de:Abū l-Chattāb
ja:アブー・ハッターブ・アサディー